Lusikisiki is a town in the Ingquza Hill Local Municipality in the Eastern Cape Province, South Africa. The name is onomatopoeic, derived from the rustling sound of reeds in the wind, named by the local Xhosa people. Lusikisiki is 45 kilometers inland from and north of Port St Johns. The town is positioned along the R61 (future N2 Wild Coast Toll Route) leading to Mthatha to the west and Durban to the north-east.

History

Pre-colonial era
In this era, the AmaMpondo chief's kraal occupied what is now the present town village.

Colonial era
By 1894 European settlers started settling in Lusikisiki after Mpondoland was annexed by the Cape Colony and a magistrate took up residence there with a military camp established as well.

Apartheid era
In 1953 the South African Apartheid government made attempts to persuade the people of Lusikisiki to accept the rule of Bantu authorities which they had established. The government worked with Paramount Chief Botha Sigcau to attempt to start a rehabilitation scheme in Pondoland. The scheme was presented to the Lusikisiki community but was rejected. A few days later, the police entered the area. A man called Mngqinga led a large local group to attack the police. This was later known as the Lusikisiki Revolt.

Climate
Lusikisiki receives high levels of rainfall, ranging between 874mm - 1060mm of rain per annum. Rainfall is considered unseasonal, although Lusikisiki receives the majority of its rainfall during summer. Winter temperatures reach their lowest in July, averaging 8 degrees Celsius at night. The area lies within Forest and Indian Coastal Thicket biomes, and White Milkwood (Sideroxylon inerme) are common.

Attractions around Lusikisiki

The Magwa Waterfall lies in the middle of the 1 800 hectare Magwa tea plantation, South Africa's last remaining tea estate just outside Lusikisiki. The curtain of the Magwa Waterfall falls 144 metres and drops into a narrow canyon.

Other points of interest include the Mkambati Nature Reserve which includes the Mzamba Fossil Beds estimated to be about 60 million years old, the Ntsubane Forest and Lupatana Nature Reserve.

Notable people
 Khotso Sethuntsa - Sangoma
Stella Sigcau - 1st female Prime Minister of the Bantustan of Transkei & South African national minister
Simphiwe Dana - musician
Mpho Mbiyozo - rugby union player
 H.H.T.N Bubu  -  Minister of Education   Republic of Transkei

Crime 
As of 2021, Lusikisiki has ranked number 1 in South Africa in terms of the national crime rate; these crimes includes;  domestic robbery &  sexual harassment.

See also 
Mpofu Nature Reserve
Pondoland

References

External links

http://www.sahistory.org.za/archive/sketch-map-locations-lusikisiki-district-identification-place-residence-oral-informants
http://www.heraldlive.co.za/news/2017/11/18/new-hope-brews-magwa-tea-estate/
http://www.heraldlive.co.za/news/2017/07/13/majola-tea-estate-wound/

British military personnel of the 9th Cape Frontier War
Political history of South Africa
Populated places in the Ngquza Hill Local Municipality